Eduard Mușuc (born 25 September 1975) is a Moldovan politician. In 2010 he was elected as a Member of Parliament representing the Party of Communists of the Republic of Moldova.

References

Living people
1975 births
Moldovan MPs 2010–2014
Communist Party of Moldavia politicians
People from Bălți